The history of Islam in the ancient city of Ibadan can be traced to as far back as early 19th century. It has been reported by various scholars that as at 1830 the city was full of Muslims from Yoruba, Hausa and many other tribes and varying origins. Islamic activities thus sprang up at this initial stage, though in its low ebb. Mosques were later built individually and collectively and Islamic scholars, who later became prominent Imam also migrated to the city. The actual time for the beginning of Islam have not been ascertained by the historian. However, as at 1839 mosque was found in the central Ibadan with its first Imam Shaykh Abdullah Igun Olohun.

The Imam position in Ibadan
Imam literally means a Leader. He is the spiritual leader of the Muslims who mostly lead them in prayer (Salah) and performs some other functions as sermonising them (most especially on Fridays). There are rules guiding the selection of Imams in Islam. These rules vary from one school of thought to another and are sometimes influenced by tribal and geographical factors. In the modern time, Ibadan people adopt a unique system of selecting their Imams in consonance with the situation of things in the city and the Islamic teaching of Imamship. There are two routes through which Imams are chosen on a rotational basis to the position of Imams in Ibadan namely: the Mogaji (The Heirs) and Alfa (Scholar) Lines. The first line comprises those who succeeds ancestors who have either been an Imam or contributed immensely to the development of Islamic scholarship of the city and who are close to the position before their death. Meanwhile, the second line consist of the Islamic scholars whose their roots in Ibadan have been useful in the passing judgement on Islamic matters and are still useful in sermonising and educating people on Islamic matters. The Mufassir al-‘Am (Chief Interpreter of the Qur’an) and Mufti (Chief Judge) use to come from this side of the two lines. Although, those who are in the Mogaji line are not also found wanting in discharging the duties of Islamic sermons and giving Fatwa, the Alfa line is expected to be in the front when it comes to finding solution to the Islamic issues affecting Muslims in the city.

The Ibadan Imam-in-Council
The administrative Structure of Ibadan Imams are divided into two namely: The Imam-in-Council and the General Assembly. The Imam-in-Council is an Eleven-Man committee, which is the supreme and the highest in the rank of the decision in the Central Mosque of Ibadanland. The composition of the council include top Five members from the Mogaji and Alfa Line together with the Chief Imam of Ibadan land who is the head of the council and the paramount leader of all Imams in the city. The highest in rank in the Mogaji line is known as Mogaji Agba (Chief Heir) while that of the Alfa line is Alfa Agba (Chief Scholar) who also double as the Grand Mufti and Chief Mufassir of the city. Both Mogaji and Alfa Agba are the heirs apparent, on rotational basis, to the throne of Chief Imam of the city whenever the position is vacant.

The Current Imam-in-Council of Ibadan land
Sheikh Alhaj Imam Abdul-Ganiyy Abubakr Agbotomokekere		(Chief Imam of Ibadanland)

Mogaji Line
Sheikh Alhaj Shittu Alagunfon (Mogaji Agba)
Sheikh Alhaj Zakariyau Badmus Ona’do (Ajanasi Agba)
Sheikh Alhaj Dr. Abdul-Waheed Ahmad al-Rufa’i
Sheikh Alhaj Abdul-Majeed Abata
Sheikh Alhaj Nurudeen Basunu		

Alfa Line
Shiekh Alhaj Abdul Fatai Alaga (Alfa Agba, Mufti, & Mufassir)
Shaykh Alhaj Isa Hussayn Odo Elegun
Shaykh Alhaj Dr. Barihi Adetunji
Shaykh Alhaj Aninaloju
Shaykh Alhaj Matanmi

List of Ibadan Chief Imams
SN	NAMES	     AREA/COMPOUND IN IBADAN	     DATES
	Imam Abdullah Igun Olohun	Ayeye	... - 1839
	Imam Uthman AbuBakr Basunu I	Ita-Okoro	1839 - 1871
	Imam Ahmad Qifu I	Isale-Alfa	1871 - 1872
	Imam Haruna I	Agbeni	1872 - 1884
	Imam Sulaiman Alagunfon	Agbeni	1884 - 1886
	Imam Ibrahim Gambari	Oja'gbo	1886 - 1896
	Imam Abdullah Uthman Basunu II	Ita-Okoro	1896 - 1911
	Imam Muhammadul-Awwal Ahmad Qifu II	Isale-Alfa	1911 - 1922
	Imam Haruna Matanmi	Oke-Gege	1922 - 1935
	Imam Ali Muhammad Afasegbejo Haruna II	Agbeni	1935 - 1940
	Imam Muhammad Bello Yusuf Inakoju I	Oke-Oja	1940
	Imam Muhalli Abdullah Basunu III	Ita-Okoro 	1940 - 1982
	Imam Muhammad Sadiq Ali Folorunso	Popoyemoja	1983 - 1988
	Imam Mudaththir Abdul-Salam	Isale-Osun	1988 - 1991
	Imam Muhammadul-Hadi Bello Inakoju II	Oke-Oja	1991 - 1993
	Imam Abdul-Karim Ahmad al-Rifa'i	Oke-Are	1993 - 1995
	Imam Busari Shu'ara' Haruna III	Agbeni	1995 - 2015
	Imam Abdul-Ganiyy AbuBakr Agbotomokekere (Gatta)	Oke-Koto	2015 
till present

References

 Oladiti Abiodun Akeem 2014. Islam and Colonial Rule in Ibadan, 1893 - 1960. Historical Research Letter. Vol 9
 Adetunji Barihi et al. 2013. Arabic Poetry in Ibadanland: Historical Perspectives, Journal of Resourcefulness and Distinction, Vol 5 No 1
 THE CITY OF IBADAN. 1967. Edited by P. C. Lloyd, A. L. Mabogunje and B. Awe. Cambridge: The University Press in association with the Institute of African Studies, University of Ibadan.

History of Ibadan
Islam in Nigeria
Religion in Ibadan